Kristina Kraszewski (born August 11, 1979) is an American former professional tennis player.

Raised in California, Kraszewski has a father who is Polish and a mother from Nebraska. After graduating from West Torrance High School she returned to her birth state of Washington to attend college and became a three-time All-American for the Washington Huskies. She twice featured in US Open qualifying and won three ITF titles, including a $25,000 tournament in Winnipeg. Her career best ranking was 229 in the world, attained in 2001.

ITF finals

Singles: 3 (3–0)

Doubles: 4 (2–2)

References

External links
 
 

1979 births
Living people
American female tennis players
Washington Huskies athletes
College women's tennis players in the United States
Tennis people from California
Tennis people from Washington (state)
American people of Polish descent
Sportspeople from Torrance, California